The 2013 Nicholls State Colonels football team represented Nicholls State University as a member of the Southland Conference during the 2013 NCAA Division I FCS football season. Led by fourth-year head coach Charlie Stubbs, the Colonels compiled an overall record of 4–6 with a mark of 1–6 in conference play, tying for seventh place in the Southland. Nicholls State played home games at John L. Guidry Stadium in Thibodaux, Louisiana.

Schedule

^Tape delayed airing

Game summaries

Oregon

Sources:

Western Michigan

Sources:

Louisiana-Lafayette

Sources:

Langston

Sources:

Arkansas Tech

Sources:

Northwestern State

Sources:

Stephen F. Austin

Sources:

McNeese State

Sources:

Lamar

Sources:

Sam Houston State

Sources:

Central Arkansas

Sources:

Southeastern Louisiana

Sources:

Media
Nicholls State football games were broadcast live on the radio through KLRZ 100.3 FM, KLEB AM 1600, and KBZE 105.9 FM. KLRZ and KLEB also streamed the games online.

References

Nicholls State
Nicholls Colonels football seasons
Nicholls State Colonels football